Three human polls and one formula ranking make up the 2010 NCAA Division I FBS (Football Bowl Subdivision) football rankings, in addition to various publications' preseason polls. Unlike most sports, college football's governing body, the NCAA, does not bestow a national championship title. That title is bestowed by one or more of four different polling agencies. There are two main weekly polls that begin in the preseason: the AP Poll and the Coaches Poll. Two additional polls are released midway through the season; the Harris Interactive Poll is released after the sixth week of the season and the Bowl Championship Series (BCS) standings is released after the seventh week. The Harris Poll and Coaches Poll are factors in the BCS standings. At the end of the season, on Sunday, December 5, 2010, the BCS standings determines who plays in the BCS bowl games as well as the 2011 BCS National Championship Game on January 10, 2011 at the University of Phoenix Stadium in Glendale, Arizona.

Legend

AP Poll

Coaches Poll

Harris Interactive Poll

BCS standings

References

Rankings
NCAA Division I FBS football rankings
Bowl Championship Series